LXR may refer to:

 LXR Cross Referencer, a software tool
 Luxury Resorts, owned by the Blackstone Group. 
 Air Luxor (ICAO code), a former airline
 Liver X receptor, a member of the nuclear receptor family of transcription factors
 Luxor International Airport (IATA airport code)
 LX(R)-class amphibious warfare ship
 LXR Hotels & Resorts